Glenkeen or Glankeen is a civil parish in County Tipperary, Ireland. It is one of seven civil parishes in the barony of Kilnamanagh Upper.

The former Church of Ireland parish of Glenkeen, which was co-extensive with the civil parish, was in the diocese of Cashel (which is now part of the diocese of Cashel and Ossory) and its glebe house was in the townland of Glenkeen.

This civil parish is unusual in that, when the parish structure of the Catholic church was re-established, the resultant ecclesiastical parish, that of Borrisoleigh and Ileigh (which is part of the Roman Catholic Archdiocese of Cashel and Emly), was (and is) co-extensive with the civil parish.

The town of Borrisoleigh is located in the parish, which encompasses 14,215 statute acres
and is divided into 78 townlands:

Aughnaheela 
Aughvolyshane
Ballydaff
Ballynahow
Ballyroan
Borrisland North
Borrisland South
Cappanilly
Carrigeen
Castlehill
Castlequarter
Cloghinch
Coolataggle
Coolaun
Coolcormack
Coolderry
Cooleen
Cottage
Cronavone
Cullahill 

Currabaha
Curraghcarroll
Curraghfurnisha
Curraghglass
Curraghgraigue
Curraghkeal
Curraghleigh
Curraghnaboola
Dogstown
Drumgill
Drumtarsna
Fantane North
Fantane South
Garrane
Garrangrena Lower
Garrangrena Upper
Glenbreedy
Glenkeen
Glennanoge
Glennariesk 

Glentane
Gortalough
Gortaniddan
Gorteennabarna
Gorteeny
Gortnaboley
Gortnacran Beg
Gortnacran More
Grangelough
Grangeroe
Kileroe
Kilfithmone
Killamoyne
Knockakelly
Knockanevin
Knockannabinna
Knockanora
Knockbrack
Knockdunnee
Knockinure 

Knocknaharney 
Knockshearoon 
Knockwilliam 
Lismakeeve 
Liss 
Moankeenane 
Mountgeorge 
Paddock 
Pallas Lower 
Pallas Upper 
Rathcardan 
Rathmoy 
Rosnamulteeny 
Rusheen Beg 
Rusheen More 
Shanballycleary 
Springfield 
Summerhill

References

Civil parishes of Kilnamanagh Upper
Borrisoleigh